The 2019 Texas Rangers season was the 59th of the Texas Rangers franchise overall, their 48th in Arlington as the Rangers, and their 26th and final season at Globe Life Park in Arlington. The Rangers began the season on March 28 against the Chicago Cubs and finished the season on September 29 against the New York Yankees. On November 2, 2018, Chris Woodward was hired to be the manager of the Rangers for the 2019 season. Despite a strong May and June for the team, they fell apart after that, failing to qualify for the postseason for the third consecutive year.

Regular season

Season standings

American League West

American League Wild Card

Record against opponents

Game log

|- style="background:#fbb;"
| 1 || March 28 || Cubs || 4–12 || Lester (1–0) || Minor (0–1) || — || 48,538 || 0–1 || L1
|- style="background:#cfc;"
| 2 || March 30 || Cubs || 8–6 || Kelley (1–0) || Edwards Jr. (0–1) || Leclerc (1) || 46,238 || 1–1 || W1
|- style="background:#cfc;"
| 3 || March 31 || Cubs || 11–10 || Leclerc (1–0) || Strop (0–1) || — || 36,812 || 2–1 || W2
|-

|- style="background:#fbb;"
| 4 || April 1 || Astros || 1–2 || Peacock (1–0) || Sampson (0–1) || Osuna (1) || 18,056 || 2–2 || L1
|- style="background:#cfc;"
| 5 || April 2 || Astros || 6–4 || Kelley (2–0) || Valdez (0–1) || Leclerc (2) || 17,907 || 3–2 || W1
|- style="background:#cfc;"
| 6 || April 3 || Astros || 4–0 || Minor (1–1) || Cole (0–2) || — || 22,265 || 4–2 || W2
|- style="background:#cfc;"
| 7 || April 4 || @ Angels || 11–4 || Springs (1–0) || Harvey (0–1) || — || 42,027 || 5–2 || W3
|- style="background:#fbb;"
| 8 || April 5 || @ Angels || 1–3 || Anderson (1–0) || Lynn (0–1) || Allen (1) || 41,089 || 5–3 || L1
|- style="background:#fbb;"
| 9 || April 6 || @ Angels || 1–5 || Skaggs (1–1) || Smyly (0–1) || — || 31,747 || 5–4 || L2
|- style="background:#fbb;"
| 10 || April 7 || @ Angels || 2–7 || Anderson (2–0) || Miller (0–1) || — || 42,076 || 5–5 || L3
|- style="background:#fbb;"
| 11 || April 9 || @ Dbacks || 4–5 || Andriese (2–0) || Leclerc (1–1) || — || 16,620 || 5–6 || L4
|- style="background:#cfc;"
| 12 || April 10 || @ Dbacks || 5–2 || Lynn (1–1) || Chafin (0–1) || Bird (1) || 15,871 || 6–6 || W1
|- style="background:#fbb;"
| 13 || April 12 || Athletics || 6–8 || Trivino (1–0) || Martin (0–1) || Treinen (5) || 24,817 || 6–7 || L1
|- style="background:#bbb;"
| – || April 13 || Athletics || colspan="9"| Postponed (rain); Rescheduled for June 8 as part of a doubleheader.
|- style="background:#cfc;"
| 14 || April 14 || Athletics || 8–7 || Springs (2–0) || Soria (0–2) || Leclerc (3) || 26,350 || 7–7 || W1
|- style="background:#cfc;"
| 15 || April 15 || Angels || 12–7 || Dowdy (1–0) || Bedrosian (1–1) || Leclerc (4) || 18,265 || 8–7 || W2
|- style="background:#cfc;"
| 16 || April 16 || Angels || 5–0 || Minor (2–1) || Barría (1–1) || — || 17,704 || 9–7 || W3
|- style="background:#cfc;"
| 17 || April 17 || Angels || 5–4 || Lynn (2–1) || Harvey (0–2) || Leclerc (5) || 16,691 || 10–7 || W4
|- style="background:#fbb;"
| 18 || April 19 || Astros || 2–7 || Verlander (3–0) || Smyly (0–2) || — || 35,649 || 10–8 || L1
|- style="background:#cfc;"
| 19 || April 20 || Astros || 9–4 || Kelley (3–0) || Cole (1–3) || — || 39,636 || 11–8 || W1
|- style="background:#cfc;"
| 20 || April 21 || Astros || 11–10 || Miller (1–1) || McHugh (3–2) || Kelley (1) || 26,225 || 12–8 || W2
|- style="background:#fbb"
| 21 || April 22 || @ Athletics || 1–6 || Bassitt (1–0) || Minor (2–2) || — || 8,073 || 12–9 || L1
|- style="background:#fbb"
| 22 || April 23 || @ Athletics || 5–11 || Montas (4–1) || Lynn (2–2) || — || 10,496 || 12–10 || L2
|- style="background:#fbb"
| 23 || April 24 || @ Athletics || 5–6 || Treinen (1–1) || Martin (0–2) || — || 18,610|| 12–11 || L3
|- style="background:#fbb"
| 24 || April 25 || @ Mariners || 2–14 || Gonzales (5–0) || Hearn (0–1) || — || 12,644 || 12–12 || L4
|- style="background:#fbb"
| 25 || April 26 || @ Mariners || 4–5 (11) || Elías (2–0) || Dowdy (1–1) || — || 21,721 || 12–13 || L5
|- style="background:#cfc"
| 26 || April 27 || @ Mariners || 15–1 || Minor (3–2) || Leake (2–3) || — || 26,493 || 13–13 || W1
|- style="background:#cfc"
| 27 || April 28 || @ Mariners || 14–1 || Lynn (3–2) || Swanson (0–3) || — || 21,503 || 14–13 || W2
|- style="background:#fbb"
| 28 || April 30 || Pirates || 4–6 (11) || Crick (1–1)  || Chavez (0–1) || Vázquez (7)  || 18,641 || 14–14 || L1
|-

|- style="background:#fbb"
| 29 || May 1 || Pirates || 5–7 || Taillon (2–3)  || Miller (1–2) || Vázquez (8)  || 23,562 || 14–15 || L2 
|- style="background:#fbb;"
| 30 || May 3 || Blue Jays || 0–1 (12) || Hudson (2–1) || Jurado (0–1) || Giles (8) || 26,179 || 14–16 || L3
|- style="background:#cfc;"
| 31 || May 4 || Blue Jays || 8–5 || Lynn (4–2) || Pannone (1–3) || Kelley (2) || 31,787 || 15–16 || W1
|- style="background:#cfc;"
| 32 || May 5 || Blue Jays || 10–2 || Dowdy (2–1) || Buchholz (0–2) || — || 30,934 || 16–16 || W2
|- style="background:#fbb;"
| 33 || May 7 || @ Pirates || 4–5 || Feliz (2–0) || Sampson (0–2) ||  Vázquez (10) || 13,032 || 16–17 || L1
|- style="background:#cfc;"
| 34 || May 8 || @ Pirates || 9–6 || Jurado (1–1) || Lyons (1–1) || Martin (1) || 13,905 || 17–17 || W1
|- style="background:#fbb;"
| 35 || May 9 || @ Astros || 2–4 || Miley (3–2) || Minor (3–3) || Osuna (9) || 26,657 || 17–18 || L1 
|- style="background:#fbb;"
| 36 || May 10 || @ Astros || 0–3 || Verlander (6–1) || Lynn (4–3) || Osuna (10) || 33,023 || 17–19 || L2 
|- style="background:#fbb;"
| 37 || May 11 || @ Astros || 4–11 || Cole (4–4) || Smyly (0–3) || — || 35,849 || 17–20 || L3 
|- style="background:#fbb;"
| 38 || May 12 || @ Astros || 5–15 || Martin (1–0) || Sampson (0–3) || — || 41,027 || 17–21 || L4 
|- style="background:#fbb;"
| 39 || May 14 || @ Royals || 5–11 || Duffy (2–1) || Miller (1–3) || — || 19,410 || 17–22 || L5 
|- style="background:#cfc;"
| 40 || May 15 || @ Royals || 6–1 || Minor (4–3) || López (0–5) || — || 14,572 || 18–22 || W1 
|- style="background:#cfc;"
| 41 || May 16 || @ Royals || 16–1 || Lynn (5–3) || Bailey (4–4) || — || 17,469 || 19–22 || W2  
|- style="background:#cfc;"
| 42 || May 17 || Cardinals || 7–3 || Sampson (1–3) || Mikolas (4–4) || — || 34,398 || 20–22 || W3  
|- style="background:#fbb;"
| 43 || May 18 || Cardinals || 2–8 || Hudson (3–3) || Jurado (1–2) || — || 30,967 || 20–23 || L1 
|- style="background:#cfc;"
| 44 || May 19 || Cardinals || 5–4 (10) || Gómez (1–0) || Hicks (1–2) || — || 32,112 || 21–23 || W1 
|- style="background:#cfc;"
| 45 || May 20 || Mariners || 10–9 || Minor (5–3) || Leake (3–5) || — || 18,796 || 22–23 || W2 
|- style="background:#cfc;"
| 46 || May 21 || Mariners || 5–3 || Lynn (6–3) || Milone (0–1) || Kelley (3) || 19,157 || 23–23 || W3
|- style="background:#cfc;"
| 47 || May 22 || Mariners || 2–1 || Sampson (2–3) || Gonzales (5–4) || Kelley (4) || 22,400 || 24–23 || W4 
|- style="background:#cfc;"
| 48 || May 24 || @ Angels || 4–3 || Smyly (1–3) || Bedrosian (1–3) || Kelley (5) || 43,806 || 25–23 || W5
|- style="background:#fbb;"
| 49 || May 25 || @ Angels || 2–3 || Robles (2–0) || Kelley (3–1) || — || 36,392 || 25–24 || L1
|- style="background:#fbb;"
| 50 || May 26 || @ Angels || 6–7 || García (1–1) || Springs (2–1) || Justin Anderson (1) || 39,406 || 25–25 || L2
|- style="background:#fbb;"
| 51 || May 27 || @ Mariners || 2–6 || Milone (1–1) || Lynn (6–4) || — || 14,135 || 25–26 || L3
|- style="background:#cfc;"
| 52 || May 28 || @ Mariners || 11–4 || Sampson (3–3) || Gonzales (5–5) || — || 12,452 || 26–26 || W1
|- style="background:#cfc;"
| 53 || May 29 || @ Mariners || 8–7 || Chavez (1–1) || Bass (0–1) || Kelley (6) || 16,059 || 27–26 || W2
|- style="background:#fbb;"
| 54 || May 30 || Royals || 2–4 || Junis (4–5) || Minor (5–4) || Kennedy (3) || 26,202 || 27–27 ||  L1
|- style="background:#cfc;"
| 55 || May 31 || Royals || 6–2 || Jurado (2–2) || Duffy (3–2) || — || 31,175 || 28–27 || W1
|-

|- style="background:#cfc;"
| 56 || June 1 || Royals || 6–2 || Lynn (7–4) || Bailey (4–6) || — || 27,133 || 29–27 || W2
|- style="background:#cfc;"
| 57 || June 2 || Royals || 5–1 || Sampson (4–3) || Keller (3–7) || — || 21,891 || 30–27 || W3
|- style="background:#fbb;"
| 58 || June 4 || Orioles || 11–12 || Bundy (3–6) || Smyly (1–4) || Givens (5) || 21,903 || 30–28 || L1
|- style="background:#cfc;"
| 59 || June 5 || Orioles || 2–1 (12) || Springs (3–1) || Fry (0–3) || — || 21,163 || 31–28 || W1
|- style="background:#cfc;"
| 60 || June 6 || Orioles || 4–3 || Jurado (3–2) || Hess (1–8) || Kelley (7) || 20,462 || 32–28 || W2
|- style="background:#fbb;"
| 61 || June 7 || Athletics || 3–5 ||Petit (1–1) ||Leclerc (1–2) || Treinen (13) || 25,120 || 32–29 || L1
|- style="background:#cfc;"
| 62 || June 8 (1) || Athletics || 10–5 ||Springs (4–1)  || Blackburn (0–1) || — || 22,327 || 33–29 ||W1
|- style="background:#cfc;"
| 63 || June 8 (2) || Athletics || 3–1 || Sampson (5–3) || Bassitt (3–2) || — || 39,514 || 34–29 || W2
|- style="background:#fbb;"
| 64 || June 9 || Athletics || 8–9 || Montas (8–2) || Smyly (1–5) || Treinen (14) || 20,358 || 34–30 || L1
|- style="background:#cfc;"
| 65 || June 10 || @ Red Sox || 4–3 (11) || Chavez (2–1) || Brasier (2–3) || Martin (2) || 34,422 || 35–30 || W1
|- style="background:#cfc;"
| 66 || June 11 || @ Red Sox || 9–5 || Jurado (4–2) || Hernández (0–1) || — || 35,121 || 36–30 || W2
|- style="background:#fbb;"
| 67 || June 12 || @ Red Sox || 3–4 || Barnes (3–1) || Chavez (2–2) || — || 34,330 || 36–31 || L1
|- style="background:#fbb;"
| 68 || June 13 || @ Red Sox || 6–7 || Workman (4–1) || Fairbanks (0–1) || Smith (1) || 35,841 || 36–32 || L2
|- style="background:#cfc;"
| 69 || June 14 || @ Reds || 7–1 || Martin (1–0) || Mahle (2–7) || Smyly (1) || 30,090 || 37–32 || W1
|- style="background:#cfc;"
| 70 || June 15 || @ Reds || 4–3 || Minor (6–4) || Roark (4–6) || Kelley (8) || 25,693 || 38–32 || W2
|- style="background:#fbb;"
| 71 || June 16 || @ Reds || 3–11 || Gray (3–5) || Jurado (4–3) || — || 24,079 || 38–33 || L1
|- style="background:#cfc;"
| 72 || June 17 || Indians || 7–2 || Lynn (8–4) || Clevinger (1–1) || — || 20,860 || 39–33 || W1
|- style="background:#fbb;"
| 73 || June 18 || Indians || 3–10 || Plesac (2–2) || Sampson (5–4) || — || 19,233 || 39–34 || L1
|- style="background:#fbb;"
| 74 || June 19 || Indians || 4–10 || Pérez (2–1) || Palumbo (0–1) || — || 22,906 || 39–35 || L2
|- style="background:#cfc;"
| 75 || June 20 || Indians || 4–2 || Minor (7–4) || Bieber (6–3) || Kelley (9) || 18,531 || 40–35 || W1
|- style="background:#fbb;"
| 76 || June 21 || White Sox || 4–5  || Herrera (3–3) || Kelley (3–2) || Colomé (16) || 29,333 || 40–36 || L1
|- style="background:#cfc;"
| 77 || June 22 || White Sox || 6–5 || Lynn (9–4) || Marshall (3–1) ||  Martin (3) || 33,582 || 41–36 || W1
|- style="background:#cfc;"
| 78 || June 23 || White Sox || 7–4 || Sampson (6–4) || Nova (3–6) || Kelley (10) || 21,917 || 42–36 || W2
|- style="background:#cfc;"
| 79 || June 25 || @ Tigers || 5–3 || Chavez (3–2) || Zimmermann (0–5) || — ||  18,952 || 43–36 || W3
|- style="background:#cfc;"
| 80 || June 26 || @ Tigers || 4–1 || Minor (8–4) || Boyd (5–6) || — || 19,732 || 44–36 || W4
|- style="background:#cfc;"
| 81 || June 27 || @ Tigers || 3–1 || Jurado (5–3) || Turnbull (3–8) || Kelley (11) || 22,925 || 45–36 || W5
|- style="background:#cfc;"
| 82 || June 28 || @ Rays || 5–0 || Lynn (10–4) || Chirinos (7–4) || — || 13,955 || 46–36 || W6
|- style="background:#fbb;"
| 83 || June 29 || @ Rays || 2–5 || McKay (1–0) || Sampson (6–5) || — || 16,655 || 46–37 || L1
|- style="background:#fbb;"
| 84 || June 30 || @ Rays || 2–6 || Snell (5–7) || Chavez (3–3) || — || 11,234 || 46–38 || L2
|-

|- style="background:#bbb;"
| – || July 1 || Angels || colspan="9"| Postponed (death of Angels' P Tyler Skaggs); Rescheduled for August 20 as part of a doubleheader. 
|- style="background:#fbb;"
| 85 || July 2 || Angels || 4–9 || Cahill (3–6) || Fairbanks (0–2) || — || 20,931 || 46–39 || L3
|- style="background:#fbb;"
| 86 || July 3 || Angels || 2–6 || Barría (3–2) || Jurado (5–4) || — || 28,998 || 46–40 || L4
|- style="background:#cfc;"
| 87 || July 4 || Angels || 9–3 || Lynn (11–4) || Canning (3–5) || — || 45,566 || 47–40 || W1
|- style="background:#fbb;"
| 88 || July 5 || @ Twins || 6–15 || Pérez (8–3) || Sampson (6–6) || || 38,073 || 47–41 || L1
|- style="background:#fbb;"
| 89 || July 6 || @ Twins || 4–7 || Pineda (6–4) || Chavez (3–4) || Rogers (12) || 36,969 || 47–42 || L2
|- style="background:#cfc;"
| 90 || July 7 || @ Twins || 4–1  || Kelley (4–2) || Mejía (0–2) || — || 35,495 || 48–42 || W1
|- style="text-align:center; background:#bbcaff;"
| colspan="10" | 90th All-Star Game in Cleveland, Ohio
|- style="background:#cfc;"
| 91 || July 11 || Astros || 5–0 || Lynn (12–4) || Valdez (3–5) || — || 37,964 || 49–42 || W2
|- style="background:#cfc;"
| 92 || July 12 || Astros || 9–8 || Kelley (5–2) || Osuna (3–2) || — || 32,322 || 50–42 || W3
|- style="background:#fbb;"
| 93 || July 13 || Astros || 6–7  || James (4–0) || Martin (1–1) || Osuna (20) || 42,452 || 50–43 || L1
|- style="background:#fbb;"
| 94 || July 14 || Astros || 4–12 || Verlander (11–4) || Jurado (5–5) || — || 27,916 || 50–44 || L2
|- style="background:#fbb;"
| 95 || July 16 || Dbacks || 2–9 || Young (3–0) || Lynn (12–5) || — ||  19,202 || 50–45 || L3
|- style="background:#fbb;"
| 96 || July 17 || Dbacks || 4–19 || Ray (8–6) || Chavez (3–5) || — || 26,681 || 50–46 || L4
|- style="background:#fbb;"
| 97 || July 19 || @ Astros || 3–4 || Verlander (12–4) || Minor (8–5) || Osuna (21) || 42,287 || 50–47 || L5
|- style="background:#fbb;"
| 98 || July 20 || @ Astros || 1–6 || Urquidy (1–0) || Jurado (5–6) || — || 41,643 || 50–48 || L6
|- style="background:#fbb;"
| 99 || July 21 || @ Astros || 3–5 || Armenteros (1–0) || Lynn (12–6) || Osuna (22) || 37,655 || 50–49 || L7
|- style="background:#fbb;"
| 100 || July 22 || @ Mariners || 3–7 || Gonzales (11–8) || Sampson (6–7) || Elías (12) || 16,091 || 50–50 || L8
|- style="background:#cfc;"
| 101 || July 23 || @ Mariners || 7–2 || Payano (1–0) || Milone (1–5) || — || 15,543 || 51–50 || W1
|- style="background:#fbb;"
| 102 || July 24 || @ Mariners || 3–5 || Leake (9–8) || Minor (8–6) || Elías (13) || 28,163 || 51–51 || L1
|- style="background:#cfc;"
| 103 || July 25 || @ Athletics || 11–3 || Jurado (6–6) || Anderson (9–6) || — || 11,854 || 52–51 || W1
|- style="background:#cfc;"
| 104 || July 26 || @ Athletics || 5–2 || Lynn (13–6) || Mengden (5–2) || Martin (4) || 14,952 || 53–51 || W2
|- style="background:#fbb;"
| 105 || July 27 || @ Athletics || 4–5 || Bailey (9–7) || Sampson (6–8) || Hendriks (9) || 36,468 || 53–52 || L1
|- style="background:#fbb;"
| 106 || July 28 || @ Athletics || 5–6 || Treinen  (4–3) || Leclerc (1–3) || — || 18,906 || 53–53 ||L2
|- style="background:#fbb;"
| 107 || July 30 || Mariners || 5–8 || Tuivailala (1–0) || Martin (1–2) || Elías (14) || 20,599 || 53–54 || L3
|- style="background:#cfc;"
| 108 || July 31 || Mariners || 9–7 || Minor (9–6) || LeBlanc (6–4) || Chavez (1) || 22,539 || 54–54 || W1
|-

|- style="background:#cfc;"
| 109 || August 2 || Tigers || 5–4 || Lynn (14–6) || Alexander (0–2) || Leclerc (6) || 26,884 || 55–54 ||W2
|- style="background:#cfc;"
| 110 || August 3 || Tigers || 5–4 (10) || Leclerc (2–3) || Ramirez (5–4) || — || 30,292 || 56–54 || W3
|- style="background:#cfc;"
| 111 || August 4 || Tigers || 9–4 || Montero (1–0) || Cisnero (0–3) || — || 18,531 || 57–54 ||W4
|- style="background:#cfc;"
| 112 || August 5 || @ Indians || 1–0 || Minor (10–6) || Civale (1–1) || Leclerc (7) || 17,690 || 58–54 ||W5
|- style="background:#bbb;"
| – || August 6 || @ Indians || colspan="9"| Postponed (inclement weather); Rescheduled for August 7 as part of a doubleheader.
|- style="background:#fbb
| 113 || August 7 (1) || @ Indians || 0–2 || Goody (3–0) || Jurado (6–7) || Hand (28) || 35,041 || 58–55 || L1
|- style="background:#fbb
| 114 || August 7 (2) || @ Indians || 1–5 || Cole (3–1) || Lynn (14–7) || Wittgren (3) || 24,888 || 58–56 || L2
|- style="background:#fbb
| 115 || August 9 || @ Brewers || 5–6 || Hader (2–5) || Clase (0–1) || — || 35,294 || 58–57 || L3
|- style="background:#fbb
| 116 || August 10 || @ Brewers || 2–3 || Houser (5–5) || Payano (1–1) || Albers (3) || 41,903 || 58–58 || L4
|- style="background:#cfc
| 117 || August 11 || @ Brewers || 1–0 || Minor (11–6) || Lyles (7–8) || Leclerc (8) || 44,411 || 59–58 || W1
|- style="background:#fbb
| 118 || August 12 || @ Blue Jays || 4–19 || Stewart (2–0) || Jurado (6–8) || — || 16,492 || 59–59 || L1
|- style="background:#fbb
| 119 || August 13 || @ Blue Jays || 0–3 || Pannone (3–5) || Lynn (14–8) || Giles (16) || 22,958 || 59–60 || L2
|- style="background:#cfc
| 120 || August 14 || @ Blue Jays || 7–3 || Allard (1–0) || Reid-Foley (2–3) || — || 34,666 || 60–60 || W1
|- style="background:#fbb
| 121 || August 15 || Twins || 6–13 || Pineda (8–5) || Payano (1–2) || Smeltzer (1) || 20,494 || 60–61 ||L1
|- style="background:#fbb
| 122 || August 16 || Twins || 3–4 || Duffey (3–1) || Minor (11–7) || Romo (20) || 24,742 || 60–62 ||L2
|- style="background:#fbb
| 123 || August 17 || Twins || 7–12 || Duffey (4–1) || Jurado (6–9) || — || 30,136 || 60–63 ||L3
|- style="background:#fbb
| 124 || August 18 || Twins || 3–6 || Dyson (5–1) || Clase (0–2) || Rogers (19) || 18,500 || 60–64 || L4
|- style="background:#cfc
| 125 || August 19 || Angels || 8–7 (11) || Montero (2–0) || Ramirez (4–2) || — || 17,326 || 61–64 || W1
|- style="background:#fbb
| 126 || August 20 (1) || Angels || 1–5 ||Heaney (3–3) || Palumbo (0–2) || — || 17,429 || 61–65 ||L1
|- style="background:#cfc
| 127 || August 20 (2) || Angels || 3–2 (11) || Clase (1–2) || Buttrey (6–6) || — || 15,638 || 62–65 ||W1
|- style="background:#cfc
| 128 || August 21 || Angels || 8–7 || Hernández (1–0) || Cahill (3–8) || — || 19,565 || 63–65 ||W2
|- style="background:#fbb
| 129 || August 22 || @ White Sox || 1–6 || Detwiler (2–3) || Jurado (6–10) || — || 18,563 || 63–66 || L1
|- style="background:#fbb
| 130 || August 23 || @ White Sox || 3–8 || Cease (3–6) || Lynn (14–9) || — || 27,016 || 63–67 || L2
|- style="background:#cfc
| 131 || August 24 || @ White Sox || 4–0 || Allard (2–0) || Nova (9–10) || — || 26,454 || 64–67 || W1
|- style="background:#fbb
| 132 || August 25 || @ White Sox || 0–2 || López (8–11) || Burke (0–1) || Colomé (25) || 25,553 || 64–68 || L1
|- style="background:#fbb
| 133 || August 27 || @ Angels || 2–5 || Del Pozo (1–0) || Minor (11–8) || Robles (19) || 39,008 || 64–69 || L2
|- style="background:#cfc
| 134 || August 28 || @ Angels || 3–0 || Jurado (7–10) || Del Pozo (1–1) || Leclerc (9) || 37,535 || 65–69 || W1
|- style="background:#fbb
| 135 || August 29 || Mariners || 3–5 || Magill (4–1) || Leclerc (2–4) || — || 16,591 || 65–70 || L1
|- style="background:#cfc
| 136 || August 30 || Mariners || 6–3 || Allard (3–0) || Gonzales (4–11) || Clase (1) || 23,563 || 66–70 || W1
|- style="background:#cfc
| 137 || August 31 || Mariners || 3–2 || Clase (2–2) || Magill (4–2) || — || 33,668 || 67–70 || W2
|-

|- style="background:#fbb
| 138 || September 1 || Mariners || 3–11 || Kikuchi (6–9) || Martin (1–3) || — || 22,116 || 67–71 || L1
|- style="background:#cfc
| 139 || September 2 || @ Yankees || 7–0 || Minor (12–8) || Tanaka (10–8) || — || 40,015 || 68–71 || W1
|- style="background:#fbb
| 140 || September 3 || @ Yankees || 1–10 || Paxton (12–6) || Vólquez (0–1) || — || 33,711 || 68–72 || L1
|- style="background:#fbb
| 141 || September 4 || @ Yankees || 1–4 || Cessa (2–1) || Lynn (14–10) || — || 35,082 || 68–73 || L2
|- style="background:#cfc
| 142 || September 5 || @ Orioles || 3–1 || Allard (4–0) || Means (10–10) || Leclerc (10) || 8,209 || 69–73 || W1
|- style="background:#cfc
| 143 || September 6 || @ Orioles || 7–6 || Martin (2–3) || Fry (1–8) || Leclerc (11) || 10,596 || 70–73 || W2
|- style="background:#cfc
| 144 || September 7 || @ Orioles || 9–4 || Méndez (1–0) || Brooks (4–8) || — || 11,796 || 71–73 || W3
|- style="background:#cfc
| 145 || September 8 || @ Orioles || 10–4 || Minor (13–8) || Wojciechowski (2–8) || — || 16,142 || 72–73 || W4
|- style="background:#fbb
| 146 || September 10 || Rays || 3–5 (11) || Pagán (4–2) || Clase (2–3) || Fairbanks (1) || 18,467 || 72–74 || L1
|- style="background:#cfc
| 147 || September 11 || Rays || 10–9 || Gibaut (1–0) || Poche (4–5) || Leclerc (12) || 19,746 || 73–74 || W1
|- style="background:#cfc
| 148 || September 12 || Rays || 6–4 || Farrell (1–0) || McKay (2–4) || Leclerc (13) || 18,222 || 74–74 || W2
|- style="background:#fbb
| 149 || September 13 || Athletics || 9–14 || Wendelken (2–1) || Gibaut (1–1) || — || 27,813 || 74–75 || L1
|- style="background:#fbb
| 150 || September 14 || Athletics || 6–8 || Buchter (1–1) || Minor (13–9) || Hendriks (22) || 31,928 || 74–76 || L2
|- style="background:#fbb
| 151 || September 15 || Athletics || 1–6 || Manaea (2–0) || Hernández (1–1) || Luzardo (1) || 26,064 || 74–77 || L3
|- style="background:#fbb
| 152 || September 17 || @ Astros || 1–4 || Verlander (19–6) || Lynn (14–11) || Osuna (34) || 39,650 || 74–78 || L4
|- style="background:#fbb
| 153 || September 18 || @ Astros || 2–3 || Cole (18–5) || Allard (4–1) || Osuna (35) || 38,417 || 74–79 || L5
|- style="background:#fbb
| 154 || September 20 || @ Athletics || 0–8 || Fiers (15–4) || Minor (13–10) || — || 29,579 || 74–80 || L6
|- style="background:#fbb
| 155 || September 21 || @ Athletics || 3–12 || Manaea (3–0) || Burke (0–2) || — || 29,896 || 74–81 || L7
|- style="background:#cfc
| 156 || September 22 || @ Athletics || 8–3 || Lynn (15–11) || Roark (10–9) || — || 38,453 || 75–81 || W1
|- style="background:#fbb
| 157 || September 24 || Red Sox || 10–12 || Rodríguez (19–6) || Jurado (7–11) || Workman (16) || 23,341 || 75–82 || L1
|- style="background:#fbb
| 158 || September 25 || Red Sox || 3–10 || Porcello (14–12) || Allard (4–2) || — || 29,290 || 75–83 || L2
|- style="background:#cfc
| 159 || September 26 || Red Sox || 7–5 || Minor (14–10) || Weber (2–4) || Leclerc (14) || 24,612 || 76–83 || W1 
|- style="background:#fbb
| 160 || September 27 || Yankees || 7–14 || Tarpley (1–0) || Palumbo (0–3) || — || 35,168 || 76–84 || L1
|- style="background:#cfc
| 161 || September 28 || Yankees || 9–4 || Hernández (2–1) || Severino (1–1) || — || 42,870 || 77–84 || W1
|- style="background:#cfc
| 162 || September 29 || Yankees || 6–1 || Lynn (16–11) || Tanaka (11–9) || — || 47,144 || 78–84 || W2
|-

Detailed records

Roster

Farm system

References

External links
 2019 Texas Rangers season at Baseball-Reference.com
 2019 Texas Rangers Schedule and Statistics at MLB.com

Texas Rangers seasons
Texas Rangers
Texas Rangers